M. terrestris may refer to:
 Moggridgea terrestris, a spider species
 Muriella terrestris, an alga species 
 Mycoleptodiscus terrestris, a plant pathogen species

See also
 Terrestris